The Power of One is an Australian television series, featuring hypnotist Peter Powers hypnotising members of the public and forcing them to perform amusing and often embarrassing acts.

Content

The hypnotism in the show usually aims for comedy rather than exhibiting the hypnotist's skill. Examples of the acts performed on the show include:

 hypnotising someone to think they are driving an expensive car, when in fact they are driving a cheap one, or a bumper car at a fair.
 exploiting a personal weakness, such as arachnophobia or shyness.
 sexually centered acts, such as convincing a man that each of the holes in a pool table is a woman that he has to satisfy.
 making a person do something embarrassing, such as achieving instant orgasm, in response to a pre-set trigger.

Broadcast

The show previously aired on The Comedy Channel on Australian subscription television service Foxtel.

External links 
  The Power of One at The Comedy Channel
  Peter Powers Official Website

2006 Australian television series debuts
2007 Australian television series endings
The Comedy Channel original programming
Hypnosis